Balan may refer to:

Places
 Bălan, a town in Harghita County, Romania
 Bălan, Sălaj, a commune in Sălaj County, Romania
 Bălan (river), a tributary of the Râmnicul Sărat in Vrancea County, Romania
 Balan, Ain, a French commune
 Balan, Ardennes, a French commune
 Balan, Iran (disambiguation), places in Iran

People
 Balan (surname)
 Balan K. Nair (1933–2000), Indian actor
 Sir Balan, the brother of Sir Balin in Arthurian legend
 Dan Balan, singer and songwriter

Other uses
 Balam (demon), sometimes spelled "Balan" 
 Balan: Book of Angels Volume 5, a 2006 album by the Cracow Klezmer Band composed by John Zorn
 Balan, the king of Al-Andalus (Moorish Spain) and father of Fierabras in the chansons de geste
 Balan (film), the first talkie film in Malayalam
 Balan Wonderworld, a 2021 video game